Donald Eugene Petersen (born September 4, 1926) is an American businessman who was employed by the Ford Motor Company for 40 years, most notably as its chief executive officer from 1985 to 1990.

Early life 
Donald Eugene Petersen was born in Pipestone, Minnesota. Petersen served in the U.S. Marine Corps in World War II and the Korean War.  He received his B.S./M.E. from the University of Washington in 1946. He was a member of Beta Theta Pi fraternity.

Career

Tenure at Ford (1949–1990) 
Donald E. Petersen joined Ford in 1949 after receiving his MBA from the Stanford Graduate School of Business. Prior to his election as chairman, Petersen was President and COO (chief operating officer) from March 13, 1980.  He was a member of the board of directors from September 8, 1977 until his retirement in February 1990.

Donald E. Petersen stepped down as President, and became chairman of the board and chief executive officer of Ford Motor Company on February 1, 1985. Hailed a "Most Valuable Person" of 1988 by USA Today and "CEO of the Year" by Chief Executive magazine in 1989, Petersen transformed Ford with his inclusive, team-oriented management style.

Petersen was famously known for instructing the Ford design staff to design vehicles they would be proud to buy and park in their own driveways. An example of this is when Petersen asked Ford Vice President of Design Jack Telnack of the 1980 Thunderbird: "is this what you would want in your driveway?".  The negative response by Telnack prompted the company to request the Thunderbird be restyled completely. This watershed event culminated in the redesign of the ninth-generation Thunderbird, which marked the introduction of highly aerodynamic body design to Ford vehicles in North America (reducing its drag coefficient from 0.50 to 0.35), followed by similarly designed model lines, including the 1984 Ford Mustang SVO, 1984 Ford Tempo, 1986 Ford Aerostar, and 1986 Ford Taurus. The redesign of the Thunderbird became a groundbreaking and wildly successful design which pulled Ford out of its financial doldrums of the early 1980s and provided the motivation and profit which carried Ford for the next decade.

Final years at Ford (1987–1990) 
Petersen's relationship with members of the founding Ford family became strained after he opposed the nomination of founder Henry Ford's great-grandsons, Edsel Bryant Ford II ("Edsel") and William Clay Ford Jr. ("Billy", "Bill Jr.", and later just "Bill") to certain committees of the board of Ford in the wake of the death of family patriarch and former Ford chairman & CEO Henry Ford II in 1987.  Petersen's primary motivation was to permit more time to pass before a decision was made concerning the futures of the two young Fords.  The widening of this schism later cut short Petersen's tenure at Ford, after a high-profile and public disagreement spilled over into the press regarding differences in strategic direction between Petersen and the members of the Ford family.  

These differences were largely due to Petersen's purchase of the bankrupt Jaguar Cars company after a bidding war between Ford and General Motors.  In this case, the press did not have the story straight, as Petersen had indicated his plan to retire, before the decision was made to acquire Jaguar.  

In the years since, Ford contributed major managerial resources to and several times recapitalized Jaguar with no subsequent return of investment.  Ford eventually divested itself of the Jaguar asset on June 2, 2008. Today, Jaguar is quite profitable.  He was succeeded by Harold "Red" Poling.

Life after Ford (1994–present) 
Petersen has, at various times, held director-level board positions at The Boeing Company, starting in 1997, Dow Jones & Co., the Hewlett-Packard Company, Capital Research and Management Company (mutual funds), Axicon Technologies, Juran Center for Leadership in Quality (Member, Exec. Advisory Board), College of Arts & Sciences at the University of Washington (President, Advisory Board) and Long Shadows Vintners. A portrait of Petersen, painted by artist Michele Rushworth hangs in the Petersen Room in the Allen Library at the University of Washington.

Personal life 
Petersen is a member of the Business Council, the National Academy of Engineering, SAE, the Engineering Society of Detroit and Mensa.

Petersen and his wife, Jo Anne, reside in Bloomfield Hills, Michigan; Seattle, Washington; and Montecito, California.  They have two children, Leslie Price (who was born in 1956), and Donald L. Petersen (who was born in 1958).  Leslie Price has a daughter named Joanne Price. In 2006, he recommended Alan Mulally of Boeing to Bill Ford, Jr. for the position of CEO/President at Ford Motor Company.

Awards and honors 
 1981 - Won University of Washington's Distinguished Alumnus Award
 1985 - Was awarded the Stanford Business School Alumni Association's Arbuckle Award for outstanding achievement in business management
 1986 - Golden Plate Award of the American Academy of Achievement
 1988 - "Most Valuable Person" by USA Today 
 1988 - Elected as member of the National Academy of Engineering for "outstanding leadership in the development of high-quality, smaller, lighter, more fuel-efficient, and more socially acceptable automobiles"
 1989 - Named "CEO of the Year" by Chief Executive Magazine

References 

1926 births
Living people
Ford executives
American manufacturing businesspeople
University of Washington College of Engineering alumni
American chief executives in the automobile industry
Mensans
American chief operating officers
People from Pipestone, Minnesota
Stanford Graduate School of Business alumni